Sri Krishnarjuna Yuddhamu is a 1963 Indian Telugu-language Hindu mythological film, produced and directed by K. V. Reddy under the Jayanthi Pictures banner. It stars N. T. Rama Rao, Akkineni Nageswara Rao and B. Saroja Devi, with music composed by Pendyala Nageswara Rao. The film was based on the Telugu play Gayopakhyanam written by Chilakamarti Lakshmi Narasimham in 1890. It was later dubbed into Kannada and into Tamil.

Plot
The film begins with Sage Narada, who gives the Parijatha flower to Lord Krishna, who in turn presents it to his consort Rukmini. This annoys Sathyabhama and Krishna tries to pacify her. Balarama decides to perform the marriage of Subhadra with Duryodhana despite objections from his wife, Revathi. Bowing to Subhadra's wish, Krishna performs her marriage with Arjuna without Balarama's knowledge. Meanwhile, the Gandharva king Gaya, after obtaining from Brahma the boon of eternal fame, is returning to his kingdom in his airplane. Unaware that Krishna is paying obeisance to the Sun God, he spits betel leaf which falls into Krishna's praying hands. An angry Krishna swears to kill him. Fear-struck, Gaya runs for protection. Narada tells him to seek protection from Arjuna. Without ascertaining facts, Arjuna assures him protection. To keep to his word, Arjuna wages a war with Krishna. In order to the save Earth from disaster, Lord Siva appears and stops their war. Krishna pardons Gaya.

Cast

Production 
The film was based on the popular Telugu play Gayopakhyanam written by Chilakamarti Lakshmi Narasimham in 1890. K. V. Reddy also produced the film under the Jayanthi Pictures banner. The film stars N. T. Rama Rao as Krishna and Akkineni Nageswara Rao as Arjuna. Initially, Nageswara Rao was not keen on acting in a mythological film alongside Rama Rao. However, he accepted the role due to his respect towards K. V. Reddy for having directed Donga Ramudu (1955), the maiden venture of his own production house Annapurna Pictures.

Soundtrack

Music composed by Pendyala Nageswara Rao. Lyrics were written by Pingali.

Reception 
Sri Krishnarjuna Yuddhamu became a commercial success. It was later dubbed into Kannada and Tamil.

References

Bibliography

External links
 

1963 films
1960s Telugu-language films
Indian epic films
Indian black-and-white films
Hindu mythological films
Films directed by K. V. Reddy
Indian films based on plays
Films scored by Pendyala Nageswara Rao
Films based on the Mahabharata